John Donaldson may refer to:

Academics and scholars
John Dalgleish Donaldson (born 1941), mathematician and father of Mary, Crown Princess of Denmark
John Donaldson (agriculturalist) (1799–1876), British agriculturalist and professor of botany
John Donaldson (economist) (born 1948), economist at Columbia Business School
John William Donaldson (1811–1861), British philologist and biblical scholar
John Donaldson (music scholar) (1789–1865), English music scholar and educator

Politics and law
John Donaldson (Australian politician) (1841–1896), Treasurer of Queensland
John Donaldson, Baron Donaldson of Lymington (1920–2005), British judge
Jack Donaldson, Baron Donaldson of Kingsbridge (1907–1998), British politician

Sports
John Donaldson (Australian cricketer) (born 1950), Australian cricketer
John Donaldson (New Zealand cricketer) (1919–1984), New Zealand cricketer
John Donaldson (footballer), Scottish footballer
John Donaldson (pitcher) (1891–1970), baseball pitcher in the Negro leagues
John Donaldson (second baseman) (born 1943), baseball player in the American League
John Donaldson (American football) (1925–2018), American football player
William John Donaldson (born 1958), known as John Donaldson, chess player

Arts and literature
John Donaldson (author) (c. 1921–1989), British author and poet
John Donaldson (painter) (1737–1801), miniature painter
John M. Donaldson (1854–1941), American architect  from Detroit, Michigan
Johnny Donaldson, American guitarist

Other
John Owen Donaldson (1897–1930), American flying ace
John P. Donaldson (1842–1920), American soldier in the American Civil War
John W. Donaldson (1924–2008), U.S. Army general

See also
Jack Donaldson (disambiguation)
Donaldson (disambiguation)
John Donelson (1718–1785), American frontiersman, co-founded the settlement of Fort Nashborough, later Nashville, Tennessee